Kunugia undans is a species of moth in the  family Lasiocampidae. It is found in Russia, Japan, China, Taiwan, Vietnam, South Korea, Bhutan.

The wingspan is 58–105 mm. Adults are on wing in September in Taiwan.

The larvae feed on Ardisia sieboldii and Barringtonia racemosa.

Subspecies
Kunugia undans undans
Kunugia undans metanastroides  (Strand, 1915)  (Taiwan)
Kunugia undans shensiensis  (De Lajonquiére, 1973)  (China)
Kunugia undans chosenicola  (Bryk, 1948)  (Korea)
Kunugia undans iwasakii  (Nagano, 1917)  (Japan)
Kunugia undans fasciatella  (Ménétriés, 1858)  (Russia)
Kunugia undans flaveola  (Motschulsky, 1866)  (Japan)

References

Moths described in 1855
Lasiocampidae
Moths of Japan